Angel from Hell is an American single-camera fantasy sitcom created by Tad Quill. The series was greenlit to order on May 8, 2015, by CBS, and premiered on January 7, 2016. On February 8, 2016, CBS cancelled the series and pulled it from the schedule after the first five episodes had aired, leaving eight produced episodes unaired. The remaining episodes began airing on July 2, 2016.

Premise
The series is about an angel named Amy, who acts as a guardian for Allison, forming an unlikely friendship.

Cast and characters

Main
 Jane Lynch as Amy Cass, a mysterious and odd individual who reveals herself to be an angel. She has a crazy persona and can make unbelievable predictions that come true. It is suggested that Amy has been watching Allison since childhood.
 Maggie Lawson as Allison Fuller, a dermatologist who likes to multi-task and is a perfectionist. She thinks that Amy is nuts, until she discovers that Amy knows everything about her and starts believing her crazy predictions.
 Kyle Bornheimer as Brad Fuller, Allison's younger brother, who lives above her garage.
 Kevin Pollak as Marvin "Marv" Fuller, Allison's dermatologist father and boss.

Recurring
 Ginger Gonzaga as Kelly, Allison's former best friend who comes back into her life.
 Constance Marie as Linda, Marv's new love interest.
 David Denman as Evan, Allison's boyfriend whom she discovers has been cheating on her.
 Diora Baird as Brandi, a flight attendant.

Episodes

Reception

Critical response
Angel from Hell has received average reviews from critics. On Metacritic, it holds a score of 55/100, based on 18 reviews. On Rotten Tomatoes, the series score is 41%, based on 29 reviews, with an average rating of 5/10. The critics' consensus reads: "Banish thee from the airwaves, oh Angel from Hell, for sins of commonplace sitcom triteness and obnoxious use of an iconic comedic lead."

Controversy
After the series began airing, One Million Moms, a website of the American Family Association, claimed that the show "disrespects Christianity". The Christian group also suggested a list of sponsors to pull advertisements from the program.

Reference to other media
The show's main graphic (shown at top) alludes to a figure in Raphael's Sistine Madonna.

References

External links
 
 
 

2010s American single-camera sitcoms
2016 American television series debuts
2016 American television series endings
American fantasy television series
Angels in television
CBS original programming
English-language television shows
Television series by CBS Studios
Television shows set in Los Angeles